Albert John Hanson (28 September 1867 – 11 July 1914) was an Australian artist, winner of the 1905 Wynne Prize.

Hanson was born in Paddington, Sydney and studied at the Royal Art Society's school. In 1889 Hanson went to New Zealand and founded an art school at Dunedin but returned to Sydney after a short stay. In 1892 The Low Lispings of the Silvery Waves, a water colour, was purchased by the Sydney gallery, and later that year Hanson went to London. He was elected a member of the Royal Society of British Artists and in 1893 his On the New South Wales Coast near Sydney was on the line at the Royal Academy.

Hanson returned to Sydney in 1896, and in 1898 his Pacific Beaches, an oil, was purchased for the National Gallery of Australia. In 1905 Hanson's watercolour, The Blue Noon, was the winner of the Wynne Prize. Hanson was an able landscape painter in both oil and water-colour and is represented in the Sydney, Adelaide, Brisbane, Geelong, Wellington, Auckland, Dunedin, and Christchurch galleries.

He died at his home in Haberfield on 11 July 1914.

References

External links
Albert J. Hanson at artnet — includes photos of two of his paintings

1867 births
1914 deaths
Wynne Prize winners
19th-century Australian painters
19th-century Australian male artists
20th-century Australian painters
20th-century Australian male artists
Australian male painters